CARMA (not to be confused with Karma) may refer to:
 Carma, a transportation technology company (formerly known as Avego), based in Cork, Ireland
 Carma Developers, Canadian residential land developing company
 Carbon Monitoring for Action, part of the Center for Global Development
 Combined Array for Research in Millimeter-wave Astronomy, astronomical instrument composed of 23 radio telescopes
 California Affiliated Risk Management Authority, A California public agency dedicated to innovative approaches in providing financial protection for its public entity members against catastrophic loss

de:CARMA